The 2016–17 Kennesaw State Owls men's basketball team represented Kennesaw State University during the 2016–17 NCAA Division I men's basketball season. The Owls were led by second-year head coach Al Skinner and played their home games at the KSU Convocation Center on the university's campus in Kennesaw, Georgia as members of the Atlantic Sun Conference (ASUN). They finished the season 14–18, 7–7 in ASUN play to finish in a tie for fourth place. As the No. 5 seed in the ASUN tournament, they defeated USC Upstate before losing to Florida Gulf Coast in the semifinals.

Previous season
The Owls finished the 2015–16 season 11–20, 7–7 in A-Sun play to finish in a tie for fifth place. They lost in the quarterfinals of the A-Sun tournament to Florida Gulf Coast.

Roster

Schedule and results

|-
!colspan=9 style=| Exhibition

|-
!colspan=9 style=| Non-conference regular season

|-
!colspan=9 style=| Atlantic Sun Conference regular season

|-
!colspan=9 style=| Atlantic Sun tournament

References

Kennesaw State Owls men's basketball seasons
Kennesaw State